Sangatikoppa is a village in Dharwad district of Karnataka, India.

Demographics 
As of the 2011 Census of India there were 91 households in Sangatikoppa and a total population of 397 consisting of 203 males and 194 females. There were 36 children ages 0-6.

References

Villages in Dharwad district